Cesar Conde is an American media executive currently serving as chairman of the NBCUniversal News Group, overseeing NBC News, MSNBC, and CNBC. Prior to this, Conde was chairman of NBCUniversal International Group and NBCUniversal Telemundo Enterprises. Before that, he was president of Univision's networks division.

Career
Cesar Conde was named Chairman of the NBCUniversal News Group in May 2020. Under Conde’s leadership, the NBCU News Group made substantial investments in digital and streaming, became the only news organization to run three major streaming channels, and achieved historic ratings milestones.

Conde is the first Hispanic to lead a major English-language television news organization. He launched the Fifty Percent Challenge, which aims to promote diversity in the newsroom. The initiative includes NBCU Academy, a journalism training program for college students. NBCU Academy has with 17 academic institutions and provided $6.5 million in funding to prepare students for a career in journalism.

In October 2013, Conde joined NBCUniversal as Executive Vice President to oversee NBCU International and NBCU Digital Enterprises.  Prior to NBCUniversal, Conde was the President of Univision Networks and served in a variety of senior executive capacities at the company.  He is credited with transforming the Spanish-language media company into a leading global, multi-platform media brand. 

Conde served as a White House Fellow for Secretary of State Colin L. Powell from 2002–2003. He also worked for StarMedia Network, the first internet company focused on Spanish and Portuguese-speaking audiences globally, and in the Mergers & Acquisitions Group at Salomon Smith Barney.

Conde serves on the board of directors of Walmart (NYSE: WMT) and PepsiCo (NASDAQ: PEP). He is also a Trustee of the Aspen Institute and the Paley Center for Media. Conde is also a Board Member at the Council on Foreign Relations and a Young Global Leader for the World Economic Forum. He holds a B.A. with honors from Harvard University and an M.B.A. from the Wharton School at the University of Pennsylvania.

Early life

Cesar Conde was born in New York, NY and grew up in Miami, FL.  His father, Cesar A. Conde, M.D.,is an immigrant from Peru and his mother, Maria Conde, is an immigrant from Cuba. He is the oldest of three brothers; his two brothers are Jorge Conde, currently a senior partner for private venture capital Andreessen Horowitz and Enrique Conde, a partner at law firm Holland & Knight.

Education initiatives

In 2005 he co-founded the Futuro Program, a non-profit organization that provides role models and educational workshops to Hispanic high school students.

In 2009, Conde spearheaded the launch of Univision's "Es el Momento" (The moment is now) campaign, a comprehensive effort focused on informing the Hispanic community of the importance of education.  The campaign received support from the Bill and Melinda Gates Foundation, among other sponsors. In March 2011,  a Town Hall event with President Barack Obama was organized and broadcast to over 2.7 million viewers around the country.  

In May 2011, President Barack Obama announced the appointment of Conde as a member of the President's Advisory Commission on Educational Excellence for Hispanics and in September 2012, Conde was appointed to the Board of Directors of the Foundation for Excellence in Education

Under Conde's leadership, Telemundo Global Studios (TGS) launched the TGS Fellowship Program, the first-ever premier professional development project for scripted content producers in Hispanic media. It is part of Telemundo Academy, the company's multimedia academic program designed to develop new talent pursuing careers in the media industry starting from the high school age.

Community initiatives
During his time at Univision, Conde led the company to enter into several partnerships that drove national community initiatives and empowerment campaigns.  One of these campaigns was "Ya es hora", a historic non-partisan Latino civic participation campaign launched in several phases which encouraged eligible Hispanics to become US Citizens, register to vote and exercise their right to vote.

At Telemundo, Conde was the driving force behind the launch of "El Poder En Ti," a community platform focusing on three areas of importance to U.S. Hispanics: education (Tú Educación), health (Tú Salud), and finance (Tú Dinero). Telemundo's commitment to empower the Hispanic community was reinforced in March 2019 when "Hazte Contar," or "Get Counted," was added under the umbrella of "El Poder en Ti." The campaign seeks to increase participation in the upcoming elections and 2020 Census, which will help improve quality of life through a fair distribution of federal funds.

Conde spearheaded the development of Univision's first ever Teletón USA event, a 28-hour coast-to-coast televised fundraising event that exceeded expectations by raising over 15 million dollars.  All proceeds went to help families in the U.S. and toward the construction of the first "Centro de Rehabilitación Infantil Teletón" (CRIT) which will be based in San Antonio, Texas.

Organizations

 Walmart Board of Directors
PepsiCo Board of Directors
Aspen Institute, Board of Trustees
 Council on Foreign Relations, Full Member
 The Paley Center for Media, Board of Trustees
 Aspen Institute, Henry Crown Fellow

Recognitions
Conde is the recipient of numerous awards for his efforts on behalf of the Hispanic community as well as his personal achievements.  In 2012, Cesar Conde was one of 192 young leaders from 59 countries recognized by the World Economic Forum for their outstanding leadership, professional accomplishments and commitment to society.

 2018 Broadcasting & Cable Hall of Fame honoree
 2018 National Association of Television Programming Executives Brandon Tartikoff Legacy Award
 2017: Center for Communication Frank Stanton Award
 2017: Sponsors for Educational Opportunity Alumni Award
 Cablefax Most Influential Minorities – 2012, 2013, 2014, 2015, 2016 2017, and 2018
 Cablefax 100 – 2012, 2013, 2014, 2015, 2016 2017, 2018, and 2019
 2016: Award for Executive Leadership in Hispanic Television & Video from Multichannel News and Broadcasting & Cable.
 2012: T. Howard Foundation Executive Leadership Award
 2012: World Economic Forum Young Global Leader
 2010 Hispanic Scholarship Fund (HSF) Alumni Hall of Fame
 2009, '10, '11, '12: "40 Under 40", Fortune Magazine
 2009: Next Generation Leader Award, National Association for Multi-Ethnicity in Communications (NAMIC)
 2008, '09, '10, '12: "Most influential Hispanics in the US", PODER Magazine
 2007 Young Hispanic Corporate Achiever Award, Hispanic Association on Corporate Responsibility (HACR)
 Young Leader Award, Cuban-American National Council
 U.S. Hispanic Chamber of Commerce Foundation Award

Personal life 
Conde married Univision News Anchor Pamela Silva Conde in 2009. They divorced in 2020.

References

External links 
 NBCUniversal Profile

1973 births
Living people
Univision people
Harvard University alumni
Wharton School of the University of Pennsylvania alumni
Henry Crown Fellows
Chairmen of NBCUniversal